MILF Manor is an American reality television series that has been airing on Sundays on TLC since January 15, 2023. Eight single women between the ages of 40 and 60 live in a villa in Mexico to pursue romantic relationships with eight single men a few decades younger. In the first episode, the show reveals that the men are the women's sons.

Premise 

Eight pairs of mothers and sons travel to a villa in Mexico to look for love. Upon arrival, the contestants are told that the sixteen contestants were to romantically pursue each other. The announcement is a surprise to the contestants; one contestant, April, stated that she thought her son would be on a separate retreat instead of in her dating pool. The contestants perform challenges. In the first episode, the blindfolded women have to identify their son by feeling the men's shirtless torsos, and the winner of the challenge receives a night in one of the suites with a hot tub. Each mother-son pair shares a room. In the second episode, the contestants guess each other's deepest sex secrets, and one of the women reveal that she has had sex with her son's best friend. The fourth episode introduces elimination to the program, as one mother-son duo is kicked off, and the fifth episode introduces a new mother-son duo to take their place.

The show's title refers to the acronym "MILF", meaning "Mother I'd Like to Fuck", though the show's definition of MILF leans closer to the idea of a cougar, in which an older woman actively pursues younger men, whereas the term "MILF" only implies the sexual attractiveness of the woman and not her own romantic/sexual tendencies.

All episode titles are puns on mother-related songs. Titles include 'Your MILF Don't Dance', which is a play on the song 'Your Mama Don't Dance', and 'MILF Said Knock You Out', which refers to 'Mama Said Knock You Out'.

Cast

Reception 
Naomi Fry wrote in The New Yorker that MILF Manor "might be a new low for reality TV, perhaps even a rock bottom", stating that the show's premise was "only slightly less outlandish than 'MILF Island,' featured on NBC's 30 Rock, back in 2008."

Daniela Neumann, the managing director of the London-based production company behind the idea for the show, said that she doesn’t understand “what all the fuss is about" and that the series is about "female empowerment, erasing the double standard stigma of older women dating younger men, that everyone on the show had a good time, and that every man is someone’s son."

The show currently has a 17% rating on Rotten Tomatoes, wherein critics describe it as "psychological torture" and "Freudian Horror".

See also 
 List of programs broadcast by TLC

References

2020s American reality television series
2023 American television series debuts
English-language television shows
Obscenity controversies in television
Television shows set in Mexico
Television shows filmed in Mexico
TLC (TV network) original programming